Actias ningpoana, the Chinese moon moth, is a moth of the family Saturniidae. The species was first described by father-and-son entomologists Cajetan and Rudolf Felder in 1862. It is quite large, and has long, curved, hindwing tails. There are many congeners across Asia; the Luna moth (A. luna) of Eastern Canada and the United States is a close relative.

Taxonomy
The taxon ningpoana Felder & Felder had been regarded as a subspecies of Actias selene until recently  and was elevated to species level in Ylla et al. (2005).

Range
 China (Jilin, Liaoning, Hebei, Henan, Jiangsu, Zhejiang, Jiangxi, Hubei, Hunan, Fujian, Guangdong, Hong Kong, Hainan, Sichuan, Yunnan) (Zhu & Wang, 1996)
 Russia (far east) (Zolotuhin & Chuvilin, 2009)
 India- Western Ghats

Life cycle

Larva
Usually very fleshy with clumps of raised bristles.

Pupa
The pupa develops in a silken cocoon or in the soil.

Adult
Lacking functional mouthparts, the adult lifespan is measured in days. They have small heads, densely hairy bodies, and can have a wingspan ranging from 13 to 15 centimeters.

Host plants
In Hong Kong, A. ningpoana has been reared on camphor (Cinnamomum camphora) (Hill et al., 1982 as Arctias [sic] selene), sweetgum (Liquidambar formosana) (Barretto, 2004), Hibiscus, Chinese tallow (Sapium sebiferum) and willow (Salix babylonica) (Yiu, 2006)

References

Ningpoana
Moths described in 1862
Moths of Asia